Payman Maadi (born 1972), also known as Peyman Moadi, is an Iranian American actor, screenwriter and director. He is best known for starring in the films A Separation (2011) and About Elly (2009) by Iranian Academy Award-winning director Asghar Farhadi and Last Knights (2015) and the independent drama film Camp X-Ray (2014). For his role in A Separation, he won the Silver Bear for Best Actor at the 61st Berlin International Film Festival (2011).

Early life 
Maadi was born in New York City to Iranian parents. When he was 5 years old, his father, an attorney decided to move back to Iran. He graduated from Karaj Azad University with a degree in metallurgical engineering. Maadi later decided to become a screenwriter.

Career 
Maadi started his film career as a screenwriter with the film Swan Song in 2000. He later wrote several renowned Iranian films. He began his acting career in Asghar Farhadi's film About Elly (2009), continuing his working relationship with the director in the film A Separation, which was released to widespread critical acclaim.

Two years later, he received the Silver Bear award for Best Actor in Leading Role at the Berlin International Film Festival for his performance as Nader in Farhadi's A Separation (2011).  He was seen in the indie drama Camp X-Ray, which was accepted into the U.S. Dramatic Competition section of the 2014 Sundance Film Festival and was released October 17, 2014. Maadi also appeared in the HBO television series The Night Of.
In 2014 he was a jury member at the 17th Shanghai International Film Festival.

He won the Crystal Simorgh for his role in Walnut Tree (2020) at the Fajr Film Festival.This film is about a father who has to bear the burden of his children's grief under the terrible shadow of war.

Filmography

Film

Television

Awards and nominations

References

External links 

 
 
 
 

1972 births
Living people
Iranian male film actors
Iranian screenwriters
Male actors from New York City
Silver Bear for Best Actor winners
21st-century Iranian male actors
Islamic Azad University alumni
People from Tehran
Iranian film directors
Iranian male stage actors
Crystal Simorgh for Best Actor winners